This article contains lists of goalkeepers for the United States men's national water polo team at the Summer Olympics, and is part of the United States men's Olympic water polo team statistics series. The lists are updated as of March 30, 2020.

Abbreviations

By tournament
The following table is pre-sorted by edition of the Olympics (in ascending order), number of matches played (in descending order), Cap number or name of the goalkeeper (in ascending order), respectively.

*Qualified but withdrew.

Appearances
The following table is pre-sorted by number of Olympic appearances (in descending order), date of the last Olympic appearance (in ascending order), date of the first Olympic appearance (in ascending order), name of the goalkeeper (in ascending order), respectively.

Ten American goalkeepers have each made at least two Olympic appearances.

Craig Wilson is the first starting goalkeeper for the United States men's national team to have competed in three Olympic Games (1984–1992). He is the only starting goalkeeper to have won two Olympic medals (1984 , 1988 ).

Historical progression – appearances of goalkeepers
The following table shows the historical progression of appearances of goalkeepers at the Olympic Games.

Match played

Goalkeepers with at least one match played at the Olympics
The following table is pre-sorted by number of total matches played (in descending order), edition of the Olympics (in ascending order), name of the goalkeeper (in ascending order), respectively.

Craig Wilson is the American goalkeeper with the most matches played at the Olympic Games.

Historical progression – total matches played by goalkeepers
The following table shows the historical progression of the record of total matches played by goalkeepers at the Olympic Games.

Goalkeepers with at least one match played in an Olympic tournament
The following table is pre-sorted by number of matches played (in descending order), edition of the Olympics (in ascending order), Cap number or name of the goalkeeper (in ascending order), respectively.

Shots saved and efficiency
The following table is pre-sorted by edition of the Olympics (in ascending order), Cap number or name of the goalkeeper (in ascending order), respectively.

See also
 United States men's Olympic water polo team statistics
 United States men's Olympic water polo team statistics (appearances)
 United States men's Olympic water polo team statistics (matches played)
 United States men's Olympic water polo team statistics (scorers)
 United States men's Olympic water polo team statistics (medalists)
 List of United States men's Olympic water polo team rosters
 United States men's Olympic water polo team results
 United States men's national water polo team

References

External links
 Official website

Men's Olympic statistics 4
Olympic men's statistics 4
United States Olympic men's statistics 4